George Brydges  may refer to:

George Rodney Brydges (died 1714), MP for Winchester and Haslemere
George William Brydges (1678–1751), MP for Winchester and Whitchurch
George Brydges, 6th Baron Chandos (1620–1655), supporter of Charles I of England

See also

George Bridges (disambiguation)
George Bridge (disambiguation)
Brydges